Madamon is a village located in Ranni-Perunad Panchayat of Ranni Taluk, Pathanamthitta District of Kerala. It is situated in the Western Ghats and has undulating terrain. The place is blessed with Pamba, a holy river which flows through it.

Hrishikesha Temple
The village boasts of the "Hrishikesha Temple" which is a stop over for many pilgrims who pass through this village to the holy shrine Sabarimala, 60 km away. The main festival of this temple is that of Pathamudayam, meaning the 'tenth sunrise'. This occurs generally on 23 or 24 April, when the sun is exactly over this latitude. This is a 10-day festival which is the main attraction for the folks around this village. Similarly the temple celebrates the Sabarimala festive season during mid November to mid January.

Schools
The village has a government-run upper primary school (classes till Seventh Standard) and a post office. The village also has co-operative bank as well as a private bank. There is a library (Granthasala)also that exist in the village.

Economy
Agriculture is the mainstay of the population. The area has extensive rubber plantation. The villagers also tend cows and produce milk which is collected by the Milma Co-operative outlet in the village. Many young people have started plying auto-rickshas and taxis as a source of employment and livelihood.

Tourism
The village has attained prominence amongst the Sabarimala pilgrims as a stopover place. They take a break for a holy bath in Pamba river as well as for refreshments. The local temple also forms an added attraction.

Agriculture
The village folks are generally farmers growing food items like tapioca, bananas, vegetables, and cash crops like coconut and rubber. They produce Betel nut as well as black pepper. As with most other villages, a large number of the locals work outside the state, even abroad and support the families back in this village.

Transportation
Madamon is divided into Madamon Vadekkekkara and Madamon Thekkekkara. The main Sabarimala Road is going through Vadekkekkar on the other hand Thekkekkara connected to Ranni and Vadasserikkara. The main attraction of Vadekkekkara is the Church of God Madamon a Christian church started in 1960. Also another attraction is the Madamon convention by Ezhava Community conducted on a yearly basis.

References 

Villages in Pathanamthitta district